David Rosenbaum (born December 28, 1986, in Washington, D.C.) is an American soccer player who most recently played for Richmond Kickers in the USL Second Division.

Career

Youth and College
Rosenbaum attended Woodrow Wilson High School and played college soccer at the University of Virginia, making 28 appearances over two seasons, before transferring to Virginia Commonwealth University as a junior.

He also played two years for Richmond Kickers Future in the USL Premier Development League, where he amassed nearly 1,800 minutes while contributing two goals and three assists.

Professional
Rosenbaum turned professional in 2009 when he signed with the Richmond Kickers in the USL Second Division. He made his professional debut on April 25, 2009, in a 1–1 tie with the Pittsburgh Riverhounds, but was limited to just three first team appearances in his rookie season.

References

External links
Richmond Kickers bio
Virginia bio

1986 births
Living people
American soccer players
Virginia Cavaliers men's soccer players
VCU Rams men's soccer players
Richmond Kickers Future players
Richmond Kickers players
USL League Two players
USL Second Division players
Woodrow Wilson High School (Washington, D.C.) alumni
Association football forwards